The 48th World Science Fiction Convention (Worldcon), also known as ConFiction, was held 23–27 August 1990 at the Netherlands Congress Centre in The Hague, Netherlands.

The organising committee was chaired by Kees van Toorn.

Participants 

Attendance was 3,580, despite the preparations for the Gulf war which deterred many Americans from traveling.

Guests of Honor 

 Joe Haldeman
 Wolfgang Jeschke
 Harry Harrison
 Andrew I. Porter (fan)
 Chelsea Quinn Yarbro (toastmaster)

Awards

1990 Hugo Awards 

 Best Novel: Hyperion by Dan Simmons
 Best Novella: "The Mountains of Mourning" by Lois McMaster Bujold
 Best Novelette: "Enter a Soldier. Later: Enter Another" by Robert Silverberg
 Best Short Story: "Boobs" by Suzy McKee Charnas
 Best Non-Fiction Book: The World Beyond the Hill by Alexei & Cory Panshin
 Best Dramatic Presentation: Indiana Jones and the Last Crusade
 Best Professional Editor: Gardner Dozois
 Best Professional Artist: Don Maitz
 Best Original Artwork: cover of Rimrunners by Don Maitz
 Best Semiprozine: Locus, edited by Charles N. Brown
 Best Fanzine: The Mad 3 Party, edited by Leslie Turek
 Best Fan Writer: Dave Langford
 Best Fan Artist: Stu Shiffman

Other awards 

 John W. Campbell Award for Best New Writer: Kristine Kathryn Rusch

Notes 

The convention was opened by the then Minister of Cultural Affairs of the Netherlands, and the Hugos were presented by the U.S. Ambassador to the Netherlands.

This was the first Worldcon after the fall of the Berlin Wall, so was the first convention which many fans, writers and editors from Eastern European countries were able to attend.

See also 

 Hugo Award
 Science fiction
 Speculative fiction
 World Science Fiction Society
 Worldcon

References

External links 

 ConFiction 1990 convention report
 NESFA.org: The Long List
 World Science Fiction Society

1990 conferences
1990 in the Netherlands
Conventions in the Netherlands
Science fiction conventions in Europe
Worldcon